Newton River may refer to the following in New Zealand:

 Newton River (Fiordland), located in the Southland Region
 Newton River (Buller River tributary), located in Tasman District